Andrija Prlainović (born 28 April 1987) is a Serbian water polo player widely regarded as one of the greatest players ever. He was a member of the Serbia men's national water polo teams that won bronze medals at the 2008 and 2012 Olympics and gold medals in 2016 and 2020. He also held the world title in 2009 and 2015 and the European title in 2006, 2012, 2014, 2016 and 2018. In 2011, he won the LEN Euroleague with VK Partizan and in 2013 with Red Star Belgrade, where he was one of the best scorers.

Early years

Prlainović was born in Dubrovnik, Croatia and raised in Herceg Novi, Montenegro, where he came up through the PVK Jadran youth system.

Club career

Montenegro, Serbia, Italy
He started his career in Jadran (2003–2006), and then moved to Partizan Raiffeisen for five seasons (2006–2011).

In 2011, he moved to the Italian Pro Recco but he spent only one season there as the club went bankrupt. He was then invited to return to Partizan but he decided to sign a contract with another Belgrade water polo club: Crvena Zvezda. Upon his arrival at Crvena zvezda he was made captain.

PA Fluminense
In June 2010, Fluminense triumphed in the Brazilian championship (in which a record number of foreign players (15) played that year), winning their fifth title. In the finals the team overcame Pinheiros, 13–7. Prlainović scored two goals in the final.

Pro Recco
On 17 September 2011, in the first round of the Adriatic League, Prlaionović scored a goal in an easy 14–6 home win against PVK Jadran. In the second round on 24 September, he scored his second goal against  in a 16–4 home win. On 1 October Prlainović scored his second Adriatic goal in a 10–7 away win against VK Jug CO. On 8 October in the Adriatic League fourth round, Prlainović and his team-mate and fellow countryman Pijetlović were the top scorers with each scoring three times in a 14–8 away win against . Prlainović scored two goals in the fifth round on 15 October, in a 15–8 home win against Primorje EB. On 22 October Prlainović scored two goals in the first round of the Euroleague Group in an easy 13–5 win over Spartak Volgograd. On 26 October Prlainović scored another two goals in an easy 15–5 away win against VK Jadran Split, but this time in the sixth round of the Adriatic League. On 29 October he scored a goal in the Adriatic League seventh round 13–9 home win against Mladost. On 9 November Prlainović scored three goals in the second round of the Euroleague, in a 13–4 away victory against CN Marseille. On 26 November Prlainović scored two goals in the Euroleague third round, in a 10–8 win against VK Jadran Herceg Novi. On 30 November he scored another two goals, but in the eleventh round Adriatic League 16–1 away win over VK Primorac. Prlainović managed to score just one goal on 3 December in a humiliating 21–0 defeat over POŠK in the twelfth round of the Adriatic League. In the thirteenth round on 10 December, Prlainović scored three goals against VK Mornar Split in a 20–8 away win. Prlainović scored three goals on 14 December in the fourth round of the Euroleague, in a 14–9 away win against VK Jadran HN. The third goal was his 10th of the tournament. On 8 February 2012. in the fifth round of the Euroleague, Prlainović scored a goal in a 15–7 win against CN Marseille. 3 days later he scored two goals in Adriatic League fifteenth round 9–8 home win against Jug CO. On 25 February, in the last round of the Euroleague group stage, Prlainović scored three goals in the 18–7 away win against Spartak Volgograd. Four days later, Prlainović scored another three goals but in the Adriatic League fourteenth-round game behind, in a 21–5 easy home win over Mornar BS. On 3 March Prlainović scored a goal in a 12–7 Adriatic League away win against Mladost.

International career

Prlainović scored his first two goals at the European Championship on 17 January against Germany in a second game which the Serbs won by 13–12. He also scored a goal in a third game on 19 January, in a great 15–12 victory for his country against the defending European champions Croatia. On 21 January in the fourth match, Prlainović scored three goals for his national team in a routine victory against Romania 14–5. On 23 January, Prlainović scored a goal in the last round of group A, in which Serbia lost to Montenegro with 11–7. On 27 January Prlainović scored a goal in a semifinal 12–8 victory over Italy. Andrija Prlainović won the 2012 European Championship on 29 January. He scored a goal in the final against Montenegro which his national team won by 9–8. This was his second gold medal at the European Championships.

He was part of the Serbian 2008, 2012, 2016 and 2020 Summer Olympic teams which won two gold and two bronze medals. He was the top goalscorer at the 2012 Olympics, with 22 goals.

Honours

Club
PVK Jadran
 Championship os Serbia & Montenegro: 2003–04
 Cup of Serbia & Montenegro: 2004–05

VK Partizan
 Serbian Championship: 2006–07, 2007–08, 2008–09, 2009–10, 2010–11
 Serbian Cup: 2006–07, 2007–08, 2008–09, 2009–10, 2010–11
LEN Champions League: 2010–11
 Eurointer League: 2010, 2011

PA Fluminense
 Brazilian Championship: 2009–10

Pro Recco
 Serie A1: 2010–11, 2014–15, 2015–16
Coppa Italia: 2014–15, 2015–16
LEN Champions League: 2011–12, 2014–15
 Adriatic League: 2011–12
 LEN Super Cup: 2012, 2015

VK Crvena Zvezda
 Serbian Championship: 2012–13, 2013–14
 Serbian Cup: 2012–13, 2013–14
LEN Champions League: 2012–13
LEN Super Cup: 2013
Szolnok
Hungarian Championship: 2016–17
Hungarian Cup: 2017
LEN Champions League: 2016–17
LEN Super Cup: 2017
CN Marseille
France Championship: 2020–21, 2021–22

National team
National team European junior championship 2004, 2006
World junior championship 2005
Olympic games gold 2016, 2020 bronze 2008, 2012
World championship gold 2009,2015 silver 2011 bronze 2017
European championship gold 2006, 2012, 2014, 2016, 2018 silver 2008 bronze 2010
World cup gold 2006, 2010, 2014 bronze 2018
World league gold 2005–2008, 2010, 2011, 2014–2017, 2019 bronze 2009
Mediterranean games gold 2009 bronze 2005

Awards
 Young Sportsman of the Year by MOC: 2005
 Top scorer at Summer Olympics: 2012
2012 Olympic Games Team of the Tournament
 Sportsman of The Year by the Serbian Olympic Committee: 2012
 Best Sportsman of SD Crvena Zvezda: 2013
 LEN Champions League Final Four MVP (1): 2013 with Crvena Zvezda 
All-Tournament Team of the 2017 World Championship
 World Championship MVP (1): 2015 Kazan
 European Championship MVP (1): 2016 Belgrade
LEN Champions League Final Six MVP (1): 2017 with Szolnok 
Third Top European Player  in the World by LEN: 2016 
Member of the World Team: 2018 by total-waterpolo

Personal life
Prlainović is married to Ivana Culjkovic and has a daughter Djurdja.

See also
 Serbia men's Olympic water polo team records and statistics
 List of Olympic champions in men's water polo
 List of Olympic medalists in water polo (men)
 List of men's Olympic water polo tournament top goalscorers
 List of world champions in men's water polo
 List of World Aquatics Championships medalists in water polo

References

External links

 
 

1987 births
Living people
People from Herceg Novi
Serbs of Montenegro
Serbian male water polo players
Water polo drivers
Water polo players at the 2008 Summer Olympics
Water polo players at the 2012 Summer Olympics
Water polo players at the 2016 Summer Olympics
Water polo players at the 2020 Summer Olympics
Medalists at the 2008 Summer Olympics
Medalists at the 2012 Summer Olympics
Medalists at the 2016 Summer Olympics
Medalists at the 2020 Summer Olympics
Olympic gold medalists for Serbia in water polo
Olympic bronze medalists for Serbia in water polo
World Aquatics Championships medalists in water polo
European champions for Serbia
Competitors at the 2005 Mediterranean Games
Competitors at the 2009 Mediterranean Games
Mediterranean Games medalists in water polo
Mediterranean Games gold medalists for Serbia
Mediterranean Games bronze medalists for Serbia
Serbian expatriate sportspeople in Hungary
Serbian expatriate sportspeople in Italy
People from Dubrovnik